The 2010 Sports Racer Series is the inaugural running of the Sports Racer Series, an Australian motor racing series for small engined sports racing cars. The series began at the 2010 Clipsal 500 on 11 March and was scheduled to conclude at Eastern Creek Raceway on 24 October. A shortfall of entrants at the Phillip Island caused the cancellation of that event, and since then technical regulation clashes with the New South Wales series on which the remainder of the national series was to piggy-back, has seen no further events take place.

Calendar

The 2010 Sports Racer Series will consist of six events:

Teams and drivers
The following teams and drivers have competed during the 2010 Sports Racer Series.

Drivers' points 
Points were awarded 38-35-33-32-31-30 etc. based on race positions in each race, in each class. Points based on official series website.

References

Sports Racer
Australian Prototype Series
Cancelled motorsport events